Poritiinae is a subfamily of butterflies, the larvae of which are unusual for feeding on algae and foliate lichen.

Systematics 
 Tribe Poritiini - Oriental
 Cyaniriodes de Nicéville, 1890 (sometimes placed in Lycaeninae)
 Poriskina Druce, 1895
 Poritia Moore, 1886
 Simiskina Distant, 1886
 Deramas Distant, 1886
 Tribe Liptenini - Afrotropical (sometimes ranked as a subfamily: Lipteninae)
 Subtribe Pentilina
 Alaena Boisduval, 1847
 Ptelina Clench, 1965
 Telipna Aurivillius, 1895
 Liptenara Bethune-Baker, 1915
 Pentila Westwood, 1851
 Ornipholidotos Bethune-Baker, 1914
 Torbenia Libert, 2000
 Subtribe Durbaniina
 Durbania Trimen, 1862
 Durbaniella van Son, 1959
 Durbaniopsis van Son, 1959
 Subtribe Mimacraeina
 Cooksonia Druce, 1905
 Mimacraea Butler, 1872
 Mimeresia Stempffer, 1961
 Subtribe Liptenina
 Pseuderesia Butler, 1874
 Teriomima Kirby, 1887
 Euthecta Bennett, 1954
 Baliochila Stempffer & Bennett, 1953
 Cnodontes Stempffer & Bennett, 1953
 Congdonia Henning & Henning, 2004
 Eresinopsides Strand, 1911
 Eresina Aurivillius, 1898
 Toxochitona Stempffer, 1956
 Argyrocheila Staudinger, 1892
 Citrinophila Kirby, 1887
 Liptena Westwood, 1851
 Obania Collins & Larsen, 1998
 Kakumia Collins & Larsen, 1998
 Falcuna Stempffer & Bennett, 1963
 Tetrarhanis Karsch, 1893
 Larinopoda Butler, 1871
 Micropentila Aurivillius, 1895
 Subtribe Epitolina 
 Epitola Westwood, 1851
 Cerautola Libert, 1999
 Geritola Libert, 1999
 Stempfferia Jackson, 1962
 Cephetola Libert, 1999
 Deloneura Trimen, 1868
 Batelusia Druce, 1910
 Tumerepedes Bethune-Baker, 1913
 Pseudoneaveia Stempffer, 1964
 Neaveia Druce, 1910
 Epitolina Aurivillius, 1895
 Hypophytala Clench, 1965
 Phytala Westwood, 1851
 Neoepitola Jackson, 1964
 Aethiopana Bethune-Baker, 1915
 Hewitsonia Kirby, 1871
 Powellana Bethune-Baker, 1908
 Iridana Aurivillius, 1921
 Teratoneura Dudgeon, 1909

References

External links 
 
 
 Indo-China Poritiinae
 Royal Museum for Central Africa Images of Liptenini (as Lipteninae) 
 thaibugs.com
 Butterflies of Ghana

 
Butterfly subfamilies
Taxa named by William Doherty